Stones is the debut solo album released by Dan Seals after he parted ways from the duo England Dan & John Ford Coley to pursue a career in country music. It is his only album using the 'England Dan' moniker. Its singles "Late at Night", "Stones (Dig a Little Deeper)", and "Love Me Like the Last Time" failed to chart on the Country, although the 1st one was a minor pop hit, peaking at #57 on the Hot 100. This album was finally released on CD in 2006 on the Wounded Bird label.

Track listing
 "Stones (Dig a Little Deeper)" (Dave Loggins) - 4:40
 "Late at Night" (Dan Seals, Rafe Van Hoy) - 3:28
 "Love Me Like the Last Time" (Seals, Van Hoy) - 3:52
 "Getting to the Point" (Peppi Castro) - 3:52
 "How Do I Survive" (Paul Bliss) - 3:50
 "Holdin' Out For Love" (Tom Snow, Cynthia Weil) - 3:40
 "You Could've Been the One" (John Batdorf, Sue Sheridan) - 3:07
 "Take You Home" (Seals, Van Hoy) - 4:31
 "When It's Over" (John Ford Coley, Bob Gundry, Seals) - 2:49
 "Lullaby" (Seals, Van Hoy) - 3:31

Personnel 
 Dan Seals – lead vocals, backing vocals (1, 2, 3, 5, 7, 8, 10), arrangements (3), acoustic guitar (10)
 Jon Goin – electric guitar (1, 7)
 Paul Jackson Jr. – electric guitar (1), guitar (5)
 Ray Parker Jr. – guitar (1, 7)
 Steve Lukather – electric guitar solo (1), lead guitar (3)
 Rafe Van Hoy – gut-string guitar (2, 10), acoustic guitar (3, 8)
 Paul Worley – electric guitar (3)
 Richie Zito – electric guitar (4-8)
 Charles Fearing – guitar (5)
 Steve Gibson – electric guitar (7), guitar (8)
 Bobby Thompson – acoustic guitar (9)
 Shane Keister – synthesizers (1, 5, 7), keyboards (3, 4, 6, 8, 9)
 David Foster – synthesizers (3, 6)
 Bill Payne – acoustic piano (5)
 Nathan East – bass (1, 5, 7)
 Bob Wray – bass (3, 8)
 Jack Williams – bass (4, 9)
 Mike Baird – drums (1, 6, 7)
 Larrie Londin – drums (2, 3, 4, 9)
 Ed Greene – drums (5)
 Kenny Buttrey – drums (8)
 Paulinho da Costa – percussion (1, 5)
 Farrell Morris – percussion (3, 4, 6-9)
 Eberhard Ramm – French horn (4, 9)
 Gene Page – arrangements (1, 5, 6, 7)
 Bergen White – orchestral arrangements (4, 9, 10)
 The Shelly Kurland Strings – strings (4, 9, 10)
 Shari Kramer – backing vocals (1, 4, 6)
 Dave Loggins – backing vocals (1, 4)
 Lisa Silver – backing vocals (1, 6)
 Diane Tidwell – backing vocals (1, 6)
 Tom Kelly – backing vocals (3, 5, 8)
 Denny Henson – backing vocals (7)
 Sealatron – backing vocals (8, 9)

Production 
 Producer – Kyle Lehning 
 Assistant Producer – Tony Gottlieb
 Engineers – Tony Gottlieb and Kyle Lehning 
 Recorded at Larrabee Sound Studios, Producers Workshop and John Thomas Studio (Hollywood, CA); Redwing Studios (Tarzana, CA); Woodland Studios and Creative Workshop (Nashville, TN); Studio By The Pond (Hendersonville, TN).
 Mixed by Bill Schnee at Cherokee Studios (Hollywood, CA).
 Mastered by George Marino at Sterling Sound (New York, NY).
 Art Direction and Design – Bob Defrin
 Photography – Jim Houghton 
 Management – Susan Joseph

1980 debut albums
Dan Seals albums
Atlantic Records albums
Albums produced by Kyle Lehning